Prestwood is a village in Buckinghamshire, England. 

Prestwood may also refer to: 

Prestwood, East Staffordshire, Staffordshire, England
Prestwood, Kinver, a hamlet in Kinver in South Staffordshire, England
Hugh Prestwood
Max Prestwood
Viscount Prestwood